Bae Ho-jo (born 1 July 1977) is a South Korean boxer. He competed in the men's welterweight event at the 1996 Summer Olympics.

References

1977 births
Living people
South Korean male boxers
Olympic boxers of South Korea
Boxers at the 1996 Summer Olympics
Place of birth missing (living people)
Asian Games medalists in boxing
Boxers at the 1998 Asian Games
Asian Games bronze medalists for South Korea
Medalists at the 1998 Asian Games
Welterweight boxers
20th-century South Korean people
21st-century South Korean people